Blink the Brightest is the third album by American singer-songwriter Tracy Bonham. It was released on May 16, 2005, in the UK, and on June 21 in the US.

Track listing
"Something Beautiful" (Bonham, Marc Copely, Greg Wells) – 4:17
"I Was Born Without You" (Bonham) – 3:45
"And The World Has The Nerve To Keep Turning" (Bonham) – 4:46
"Eyes" (Bonham) – 3:44
"Take Your Love Out On Me" (Bonham) – 4:32
"Whether You Fall" (Bonham) – 3:35	
"Dumbo Sun" (Bonham, Martin Hynes) – 3:31
"All Thumbs" (Bonham, Wells) – 2:51
"Naked" (Bonham) – 3:57
"Shine" (Bonham) – 4:21
"Wilting Flower" (Bonham) – 3:04
"Did I Sleep Through It All?" (Bonham, Wells) – 3:20

Personnel
Tracy Bonham – acoustic guitar, piano, violin, electric guitar, vocals, claves, vibraphone, pump organ, fender rhodes, wurlitzer
Matt Beck – electric guitar
Greg Collins – acoustic guitar, clarinet, piano, bass guitar, Hammond organ, slide guitar
Davey Faragher – bass guitar
Mitchell Froom – piano, vibraphone
David Levita – bass guitar, electric guitar, slide guitar, 12 string electric guitar, electric baritone guitar
Ryan MacMillan – drums
Dan Rothchild – bass guitar
Sebastian Steinberg – electric guitar, double bass
Michael Ward – acoustic guitar, electric guitar
Joey Waronker – percussion, drums

References

External links

Tracy Bonham albums
2005 albums